Pietro Cogliati (born 18 June 1992) is an Italian professional football player who plays as a forward for  club Sangiuliano City.

Career

Campobasso
On 4 October 2019, Cogliati joined Serie D club S.S.D. Città di Campobasso. He left the club at the end of the season, where his contract expired. However, he returned to the club and signed a new deal at the end of October 2019.

References

External links 

1992 births
Living people
Footballers from Milan
Italian footballers
Association football forwards
Serie C players
Serie D players
Tritium Calcio 1908 players
FeralpiSalò players
U.S. Pergolettese 1932 players
F.C. Pavia players
A.S. Giana Erminio players
U.S. Vibonese Calcio players
A.C. Monza players
S.S.D. Città di Campobasso players
F.C. Sangiuliano City players